Elections were held in the Australian state of Queensland on 29 April 1950 to elect the 75 members of the state's Legislative Assembly. The Labor government was seeking its seventh continuous term in office since the 1932 election; it would be Premier Ned Hanlon's second election.

The Assembly had been increased in size prior to the election by the Electoral Districts Act 1949 from 62 to 75 seats.

Key dates

Results

|}

 718,685 electors were enrolled to vote at the election, but 3 seats held by the Country Party representing 30,376 enrolled voters were unopposed.

Seats changing party representation

There was an extensive redistribution across Queensland prior to this election, increasing the amount of seats from 62 to 75. The seat changes are as follows.

Abolished seats

 Members listed in italics resigned from politics at this election.
 The Country Party member for Dalby, Charles Russell resigned from the seat to contest and win the seat of Maranoa at the 1949 federal election. No by-election was held due to the proximity to the state election.
 The Country Party member for West Moreton, Ted Maher resigned from the seat to contest and win a seat in the Senate at the 1949 federal election. No by-election was held due to the proximity to the state election.

New seats

Seats changing hands

 Members listed in italics did not recontest their seats.

See also
 Members of the Queensland Legislative Assembly, 1947–1950
 Members of the Queensland Legislative Assembly, 1950–1953
 Candidates of the Queensland state election, 1950
 Hanlon Ministry

Notes

References

Elections in Queensland
1950 elections in Australia
1950s in Queensland
April 1950 events in Australia